Robert Frederick Hedelund (born March 23, 1961) is a retired lieutenant general in the United States Marine Corps who serves as the commander of United States Marine Corps Forces Command, replacing Lieutenant General Mark A. Brilakis. He previously served as the commander of the II Marine Expeditionary Force. Hedelund was commissioned upon his graduation from Florida Atlantic University in 1983. He is from Pompano Beach, Florida. He graduated from Deerfield Beach High School.

He retired in 2021, with his retirement ceremony held on October 29, 2021.

References

1961 births
Florida Atlantic University alumni
Recipients of the Defense Superior Service Medal
Recipients of the Legion of Merit
Living people
United States Marine Corps generals